Rachael Boyle (née Small; born 20 December 1991) is a Scottish international footballer who currently plays as midfielder for Hibernian in the Scottish Women's Premier League.

Career
Boyle grew up in Aberdeen and represented Scotland at schools' level in 2005 while a pupil at Northfield Academy. She later progressed through the national under-17 and under-19 squads, captaining the latter in the 2010 UEFA Women's Under-19 Championship finals in Macedonia. She made her full debut for the Scotland women's team in July 2010 against Poland.

At club level, Boyle began with her hometown team, Aberdeen Ladies before moving to Forfar Farmington in 2010. She also attended the Scottish FA's North Regional Football Academy in Aberdeen.

In July 2013, Boyle returned to Aberdeen after Forfar failed to make the top six at the SWPL mid-season split.

Boyle joined Hibernian Ladies in July 2016, with her fiancé Martin Boyle playing for the Edinburgh club's men's side at the same time. After winning the Scottish Women's Cup in 2016 and 2017, and the SWPL Cup in 2017, she missed much of the 2018 season due to pregnancy, and gave birth to a daughter in September 2018. She and Martin Boyle married in June 2019. 

She was recalled to the Scotland squad in November 2019.

Due to the upheaval it would cause to their daughter, Rachael opted to stay in Edinburgh when Martin left Hibs to play in Saudi Arabia in January 2022.

Career statistics

International appearances

References

External links
 
 
 

1991 births
Living people
People educated at Northfield Academy
Scottish women's footballers
Scotland women's international footballers
Hibernian W.F.C. players
Footballers from Aberdeen
Women's association football defenders
Forfar Farmington F.C. players
Scottish Women's Premier League players
Aberdeen F.C. Women players
Association footballers' wives and girlfriends